is a Japanese women's professional shogi player ranked 1-dan. Her younger sister Hana is also a women's professional shogi player, and the two are the fourth pair of sisters to be awarded women's professional shogi player status.

Promotion history
Wada's promotion history is as follows:

 3-kyū: April 1, 2014
 2-kyū: August 9, 2014
 1-dan: November 6, 2014

Note: All ranks are women's professional ranks.

References

External links
 ShogiHub: Wada, Aki

1997 births
Living people
People from Sapporo
Japanese shogi players
Women's professional shogi players
Professional shogi players from Hokkaido